Strawberry was a Canadian indie pop group formed on Prince Edward Island in 1993.

Vocalist Deirdre Smith, guitarist Scott Garratt, and bassist Brian Arsenault comprised the foundation of the band. Other members, at various times, included Mike MacDougall, Pat Deighan, Craig MacPherson, Jon King, Roger Carter, Kieran Macnamara and Simon Moore.

In 1994, they released a split-7" single with Plumtree on Cinnamon Toast Records.

In 1996, the band signed to Janken Pon/Cargo Records. The label released Strawberry's "Into the Sky" 7-inch single that year.

No Records released the band's only full-length album, Brokeheart Audio, in 1998.  Two cassette-only albums were self-released, Strawberry (1993) and Beached (1995).

References
[ All Music Guide] entry for Strawberry
Montreal Mirror review of Brokeheart Audio CD
 Earshot! Canadian National Music Charts (February 1999)

Musical groups established in 1993
Musical groups disestablished in 1998
Canadian indie pop groups
Musical groups from Prince Edward Island
1993 establishments in Prince Edward Island
1998 disestablishments in Canada